Elianay Pereira (born 11 May 1984) is a Brazilian racewalker. She competed in the women's 50 kilometres walk at the 2019 World Athletics Championships held in Doha, Qatar. She finished in 16th place. She also competed in the women's 35 kilometres walk at the 2022 World Athletics Championships held in Eugene, Oregon, United States.

Personal bests
, her best times are:

Road walk
35 km: 3:05:39 –  Eugene, 22 Jul 2022
50 km: 4:29:33 –  Lima, 11 Aug 2019

References

External links 
 

Living people
1984 births
Place of birth missing (living people)
Brazilian female racewalkers
World Athletics Championships athletes for Brazil
20th-century Brazilian women
21st-century Brazilian women